"He's Alive" is episode four of the fourth season of The Twilight Zone. It tells of an American neo-Nazi who is visited by the ghost of Adolf Hitler. Writer Rod Serling scripted a longer version of the teleplay to be made into a feature-length film, but it was never produced. This episode is notable for Dennis Hopper's breakout performance as Peter Vollmer.

Opening narration

Plot
Peter Vollmer, the leader of a small and struggling Neo-Nazi group, is mocked and ridiculed by the crowds he preaches to on street corners. Ernst Ganz, the elderly Jewish man that Vollmer has had a sympathetic, uncle-like relationship with since he was an abused and neglected kid, offers him shelter and compassion but not respect. Ernst spent nine years in Dachau and recognizes that Vollmer's politics stem from a childish desire for the respect of others. This pains Vollmer, who openly confesses that he views Ernst as a father figure, since his real father physically abused him and his mother was never around.

Beginning one night, Vollmer is periodically visited by a shadowy figure who teaches him how to enthrall a crowd. The figure teaches Vollmer how to speak, and pays Vollmer's rent at the hall where he holds rallies. He also instructs Vollmer to arrange the death of one of his followers, Nick Bloss, thereby creating a martyr to rally everyone around (a reference to the 1930 murder of Horst Wessel, a low-ranking officer in the Sturmabteilung). Following the figure's instructions and assistance, Vollmer becomes considerably more successful and his group's following grows. Ernst becomes fearful that Vollmer may actually succeed in igniting another Holocaust. He disrupts a rally, accusing Vollmer of being "nothing but a cheap copy" of the German Führer while Vollmer cowers before his surrogate father.

After the failed rally, the shadowy figure rebukes Vollmer for his failure and says that from now on he will be ordering Vollmer rather than instructing him. Vollmer demands to know who his mysterious benefactor is. The man steps forward from the shadows to reveal himself to be Adolf Hitler. He orders Vollmer to kill Ernst, and Vollmer steels himself enough to complete the task. Hitler congratulates him and asks how it felt; Vollmer replies that he felt immortal. Hitler responds, "Mr. Vollmer, we are immortal!"

Police officers arrive soon after, to arrest Vollmer for conspiracy to murder Nick. Shot while fleeing, Vollmer is astonished by the sight of his own blood. Hitler's shadow appears on the wall behind the dying Vollmer as he gasps out, "There's something very wrong here... "Don't you understand that I'm made out of steel?"

Closing narration

Production
Rod Serling was particularly pleased with the script for "He's Alive", and was dismayed when he learned that a scene set between Hitler's revealing himself and Vollmer's returning to Hitler was cut due to length constraints. This prompted the idea of doing two versions of "He's Alive": a short version for television, and a longer version for theatrical release as a feature film. His extended script added a number of scenes and even a new protagonist, an FBI agent who investigates Vollmer's neo-Nazi movement, but with The Twilight Zones budget already stretched to the breaking point, Serling's proposal was turned down. The scene following Hitler revealing himself was filmed, but the footage has since been lost.

Cast
Dennis Hopper as Peter Vollmer
Ludwig Donath as Ernst Ganz
Curt Conway as Adolf Hitler
Paul Mazursky as Frank
Howard Caine as Nicholas "Nick" Bloss
Barnaby Hale as Stanley
Jay Adler as Gibbons
Wolfe Barzell as Proprietor
Bernard Fein as Heckler
Chet Brandenburg as Audience member
Paul Bryar as Policeman
Bobby Gilbert as Man with cat
Buck Harrington as Audience member
Ed Haskett as Audience member
Robert McCord as Policeman
William Meader as Townsman in brawl
William H. O'Brien as Audience member
Bill Zuckert as Detective

References

 DeVoe, Bill. (2008). Trivia from The Twilight Zone. Albany, GA: Bear Manor Media. 
 Grams, Martin. (2008). The Twilight Zone: Unlocking the Door to a Television Classic. Churchville, MD: OTR Publishing. 
 Zicree, Marc Scott: The Twilight Zone Companion.  Sillman-James Press, 1982 (second edition)

External links
 

1963 American television episodes
The Twilight Zone (1959 TV series season 4) episodes
Cultural depictions of Adolf Hitler
Television episodes written by Rod Serling
Television episodes about antisemitism
Television episodes about ghosts
Television episodes about neo-Nazism
Television episodes about murder